Manuel José Marques Pires, better known as Manuel Balela (21 October 1956) is a Portuguese football coach.

Career 

Born in Faro, Manuel Balela has only known one shirt throughout his career as a football player; the shirt of the club of his hometown, SC Farense. Actually, having completed all his training, from youth to juniors, in the club of the capital of the Algarve, Manuel Balela has continued to wear, exclusively, the "shirt" of SC Farense throughout 8 consecutive seasons.

Coaching career 

Having finished his soccer career, as a player, Manuel Balela then passed on to occupy the position of assistant coach for the club, having immediately helped SC Farense in obtaining the title of Champion of the 2nd Division, and its corresponding rise to the National 1st Division, in the 19985/19986 soccer season.

During the season of 1989/1990, Manuel Balela managed to obtain a unique achievement within SC Farense history by leading an absolutely unforgettable campaign for the city of Faro and the Algarve region.  SC Farense makes it to the Final of the Portugal Cup Taça de Portugal, much to the complete jubilation of thousands of Farense and Algarvian fans, who had travelled twice, to watch them play at the National Stadium Estádio Nacional.

In virtue of his contribution to such a memorable campaign, Manuel Balela was distinguished with a medal of merit, presented by the civil government of Faro.
Balela has his first experience as head coach responsible for the Algarve Team Selection. 
From the moment he began his career as head coach, Manuel Balela started to put into practice all the teachings he had assimilated throughout his professional experience as a football player and assistant coach, having prepared himself technically at the highest level and obtaining the Coach Training Course at Level 4 and following on to become, since 1993, Resident Trainer of the Algarve Football Association - Associação de Futebol do Algarve.

As Head Coach, Manuel Balela trained soccer clubs such as Louletano, Wydad Casablanca, Kawkab Marrakech (whom he managed to crown Champions of the African Confederations Football Cup (CAF)), SC Olhanense, União da Madeira and SC Farense.

In the season 2009–2010, Manuel Balela was invited to train the Dong Tam Long An FC, a Vietnamese club, and has fulfilled absolutely in all the objectives which were asked of him.
Manuel Balela was distinguished in 2003 by the National Coaching Association (Associação Nacional de Treinadores), with the coveted "Candido de Oliveira" prize, and distinguished yet again in 2009 by the same Association with the "José Maria Pedroto" prize.

Accomplishments

•	Champion of the African Confederations Football Cup, won by Kawkab Marrakech football team

•	Two climbs to the 1st Division with SC Farense football team

•	Climb to the Honorary League with União de Madeira football team

•	Climb to the Moroccan First Division league with Kawkab Marrakech football team

References

1956 births
Living people
People from Faro, Portugal
S.C. Farense managers
Portuguese football managers
Sportspeople from Faro District